The Birmingham–Southern Panthers football team represents Birmingham–Southern College (BSC) in the NCAA Division III, competing as part of the  Southern Collegiate Athletic Conference. BSC plays its home games at the 1,600 seat Panther Stadium, which is located on-campus in Birmingham, Alabama and opened in November 2008. Although only fielding a team since the 2007 season, Birmingham–Southern previously fielded a team from the 1918 season that was later disbanded following the 1939 season.

History
Prior to the consolidation of Southern University and Birmingham College, each fielded football squads. Between 1904 and 1917, Birmingham College compiled a 19–32–4 record, and between 1909 and 1916 Southern University compiled a 3–16–11 record. Following the consolidation of the schools as Birmingham–Southern, the program compiled an overall record of 87–80–16 between 1918–39, winning Dixie Conference championships in 1932, 1934, and 1937.

During this period, the Panthers played their home games at the Munger Bowl, which was located on-campus and subsequently demolished in the 1960s to make way for campus expansion. Additionally, Howard College, now Samford University, was BSC's biggest rival with the annual contest being called the Magic City Classic and played in Rickwood Field before serving as the opening contest at Legion Field in 1929. Following the 1939 season, football was disbanded with the school citing its overall costs and influence on the school.
 
On May 26, 2006, the board of trustees announced that Birmingham–Southern would field a Division III football team to begin competition for the 2007 season. By the following June, Joey Jones was announced as the program's head coach, and on September 6, 2007, BSC played their first football game after a 68-year hiatus,  as the Panthers defeated the Mississippi College junior varsity 41–13 at Legion Field. After a 3–7 first season, Jones would leave BSC to become the first head coach at South Alabama, and in February 2008 Eddie Garfinkle was announced as the Panthers' head coach. On October 24, 2016, it was announced that Garfinkle would not return after the 2016 season.

Playoffs

NCAA Division III
The Panthers have made one appearance in the NCAA Division III football playoffs. Their combined record is 1–1.

Seasons

Head coaches

References

 
American football teams established in 1918
1918 establishments in Alabama